"Into Temptation" is a 1988 song by rock group Crowded House. It was the third single from the group's second album Temple of Low Men.  The single peaked at #59 on the Australian ARIA singles chart in January 1989.

"Into Temptation" appears on Crowded House's greatest hits album Recurring Dream.  The song was also performed by Renée Geyer for the Finn brothers female tribute album She Will Have Her Way in 2005.

Reception
Junkee said, "If you ever needed an example of how convincing Neil Finn’s songwriting is, consider this: Sharon Finn thought Neil was cheating on him because of this song. Add in the undercurrent of Hester’s unmistakable jazz-brush finesse and a synth-string orchestral sweep, and you’re left with one of the band’s most emotive, understated moments."

Nexus noted the, "sparse verse instrumentation, vocals front and centre, followed by a lush chorus with a melody that draws you in, its simplicity is a masterstroke and its effectiveness is measurable.

Track listings
All songs by Neil Finn except "This Is Massive" by Paul Hester.

Australian single
Released on 7" vinyl, CD and 12" vinyl.
"Into Temptation" – 4:32
"Mansion in the Slums" (live)
"This Is Massive" (live)

North American release
Released on 7" vinyl and cassette.
"Into Temptation" – 4:32
"Better Be Home Soon" – 3:07

European release
Released on 12" vinyl.
"Into Temptation" – 4:32
"Now We're Getting Somewhere" (live)
"Mansion in the Slums" (live)

Notes

External links
 Article about the song on thishereboogie.com

Crowded House songs
1988 singles
Songs written by Neil Finn
Song recordings produced by Mitchell Froom
1987 songs
Capitol Records singles